Transfer of learning occurs when people apply information, strategies, and skills they have learned to a new situation or context. Transfer is not a discrete activity, but is rather an integral part of the learning process. Researchers attempt to identify when and how transfer occurs and to offer strategies to improve transfer.

Overview

The formal discipline (or mental discipline) approach to learning believed that specific mental faculties could be strengthened by particular courses of training and that these strengthened faculties transferred to other situations, based on faculty psychology which viewed the mind as a collection of separate modules or faculties assigned to various mental tasks. This approach resulted in school curricula that required students to study subjects such as mathematics and Latin in order to strengthen reasoning and memory faculties.

Disputing formal discipline, Edward Thorndike and Robert S. Woodworth in 1901 postulated that the transfer of learning was restricted or assisted by the elements in common between the original context and the next context. The notion was originally introduced as transfer of practice. They explored how individuals would transfer learning in one context to another similar context and how "improvement in one mental function" could influence a related one. Their theory implied that transfer of learning depends on how similar the learning task and transfer tasks are, or where "identical elements are concerned in the influencing and influenced function", now known as the identical element theory. Thorndike urged schools to design curricula with tasks similar to those students would encounter outside of school to facilitate the transfer of learning.

In contrast to Thorndike, Edwin Ray Guthrie's law of contiguity expected little transfer of learning. Guthrie recommended studying in the exact conditions in which one would be tested, because of his view that "we learn what we do in the presence of specific stimuli". The expectation is that training in conditions as similar as possible to those in which learners will have to perform will facilitate transfer.

The argument is also made that transfer is not distinct from learning, as people do not encounter situations as blank slates. Perkins and Salomon considered it more a continuum, with no bright line between learning and transfer.

Transfer may also be referred to as generalization, B. F. Skinner's concept of a response to a stimulus occurring to other stimuli.

Today, transfer of learning is usually described as the process and the effective extent to which past experiences (also referred to as the transfer source) affect learning and performance in a new situation (the transfer target). However, there remains controversy as to how transfer of learning should be conceptualized and explained, what its prevalence is, what its relation is to learning in general, and whether it exists at all.

Transfer and learning

People store propositions, or basic units of knowledge, in long-term memory. When new information enters the working memory, long-term memory is searched for associations which combine with the new information in working memory. The associations reinforce the new information and help assign meaning to it. Learning that takes place in varying contexts can create more links and encourage generalization of the skill or knowledge. Connections between past learning and new learning can provide a context or framework for the new information, helping students to determine sense and meaning, and encouraging retention of the new information. These connections can build up a framework of associative networks that students can call upon for future problem-solving. Information stored in memory is "flexible, interpretive, generically altered, and its recall and transfer are largely context-dependent".

When Thorndike refers to similarity of elements between learning and transfer, the elements can be conditions or procedures. Conditions can be environmental, physical, mental, or emotional, and the possible combinations of conditions are countless. Procedures include sequences of events or information. Although the theory is that the similarity of elements facilitates transfer, there is a challenge in identifying which specific elements had an effect on the learner at the time of learning.

Factors that can affect transfer include:
Context and degree of original learning: how well the learner acquired the knowledge.
Similarity: commonalities between original learning and new, such as environment and other memory cues.
Critical attributes: characteristics that make something unique.
Association: connections between multiple events, actions, bits of information, and so on; as well as the conditions and emotions connected to it by the learner.

Learners can increase transfer through effective practice and by mindfully abstracting knowledge. Abstraction is the process of examining our experiences for similarities. Methods for abstracting knowledge include seeking the underlying principles in what is learned, creating models, and identifying analogies and metaphors, all of which assist with creating associations and encouraging transfer.

Transfer taxonomies
Transfer of learning can be cognitive, socio-emotional, or motor. The following table presents different types of transfer.

Teaching for transfer

Transfer is less a deliberate activity by the learner than it is a result of the environment at the time of learning. Teachers, being part of the learning environment, can be an instrument of transfer (both positive and negative). Recommendations for teaching for transfer include the hugging and bridging strategies; providing authentic environment and activities within a conceptual framework; encouraging problem-based learning; community of practice; cognitive apprenticeship; and game-based learning.

Hugging and bridging
Hugging and bridging as techniques for positive transfer were suggested by the research of Perkins and Salomon.

Hugging is when the teacher encourages transfer by incorporating similarities between the learning situation and the future situations in which the learning might be used. Some methods for hugging include simulation games, mental practice, and contingency learning.

Bridging is when the teacher encourages transfer by helping students to find connections between learning and to abstract their existing knowledge to new concepts. Some methods for bridging include brainstorming, developing analogies, and metacognition.

See also

 Metaphor
 Analogy, Analogical reasoning
 Priming (psychology)
 Affordance
 Language transfer
 Problem solving
 Classical conditioning
 Gavriel Salomon
 Instructional scaffolding

References

Further reading
 Corder, S. P. (1967). The significance of learners' errors. International Review of Applied Linguistics in Language Teaching, 5, 161–170.
 Perkins, D. N., & Salomon, G. (1992).  Transfer of learning. International Encyclopedia of Education (2nd ed.). Oxford, UK: Pergamon Press.
Salomon, G., & Perkins, D. N. (1989). Rocky roads to transfer: rethinking mechanisms of a neglected phenomenon. Educational Psychologist, 24, 113–142.
Tinberg, H. (2017). Teaching for Transfer: A passport for writing in new contexts. Peer Review, 19, 17-20.
 Vignati R.(2009) Il transfer cognitivo nei processi di apprendimento: un paradifma del cambiamento e della creatività?

Educational psychology
Experiential learning
Pedagogy